Xylotoles apicicauda is a species of beetle in the family Cerambycidae. It was described by Stephan von Breuning in 1943. It is known from New Zealand.

References

Dorcadiini
Beetles described in 1943